The 1960 Toronto Argonauts finished in first place in the Eastern Conference with a 10–4 record. Their first-place finish earned them a bye to the Eastern Finals.  The Argonauts lost both games of the two-game, total point Finals to the eventual Grey Cup champion Ottawa Rough Riders.

Preseason

After playing (and losing to) the NFL Chicago Cardinals in 1959, the Argonauts hosted the NFL Pittsburgh Steelers at CNE Stadium on August 3 in the second of three interleague games hosted in Toronto
and lost 43–16.  Both teams used 12 players, with a handful of NFL rules (blocking, punt returns) blended into the Canadian game.

Schedule

Regular season

Standings

Schedule

Playoffs

IRFU Finals 
(two game, total point series)

 Ottawa won the series 54–41.  Ottawa advanced to play the Edmonton Eskimos in the Grey Cup.

Schenley Award Nominees

Cookie Gilchrist was the Eastern nominee for CFL Most Outstanding Player Schenley Award, but lost the award to Jackie Parker of the Edmonton Eskimos.  Parker received 37 votes; Gilchrist received 33.

References

Toronto Argonauts seasons
1960 Canadian Football League season by team